R/V Rachel Carson is a research vessel owned and operated by the University of Washington's School of Oceanography, named in honor of the marine biologist and writer Rachel Carson. The vessel is part of the UNOLS fleet. It is capable of conducting operations within the Salish Sea and coastal waters of the western United States and British Columbia. She can accommodate up to 28 persons, including the crew, for day operations, while up to 13 can be accommodated for multi-day operations.

Service history

R/V Aora, 2003–2016 
The ship was originally launched in May 2003 at the Macduff Shipyard in Macduff, Scotland, as the 
R/V Aora, a fisheries research vessel. She was based at the University Marine Biological Station Millport in the Firth of Clyde, until the station was closed in 2013.

R/V Rachel Carson, 2017–present

In 2015 the University of Washington's School of Oceanography wanted to replace the fifty-year old , but were unable to raise the funds required to design and build a replacement. In December 2016 they found the Aora for sale on a yacht-trading website. After an inspection in March 2017, the ship was purchased for $1.07m on 8 August 2017, with the aid of a $1m gift. A programme of maintenance and some modifications at the MacDuff yard were completed in October, and the Rachel Carson was transported by ship from Rotterdam to West Palm Beach, Florida by early November. She was then transported to the University of Washington, arriving on 28 December. After further preparations and modifications the ship entered service on 7 April 2018, with a five-day cruise in Puget Sound to collect samples for monitoring by the Washington Ocean Acidification Center. She was accepted as a UNOLS vessel in the U.S. Academic Research Fleet on 24 July.

References

External links

2003 ships
Ships built in Scotland
Research vessels of the United States
University-National Oceanographic Laboratory System research vessels
University of Washington
Environmental science
RV 2017